Borysthenia is a genus of small freshwater snails with an operculum, aquatic gastropod mollusks in the family Valvatidae, the valve snails.

The aperture of Borysthenia is not circular. Animals are ovoviviparous.

Species
The genus Borysthenia contains the following species:
 † Borysthenia goldfussiana (Wüst, 1901)
 † Borysthenia intermedia Kondrashov, 2007 - from the Middle Pleistocene of Oka-Don Plain
 Borysthenia menkeana (Jelski, 1863)
 Borysthenia naticina (Menke, 1845) - type species as Valvata jelskii Crosse, 1863

References 

Valvatidae
Taxa named by Wassili Adolfovitch Lindholm
Gastropod genera
Extant Middle Pleistocene first appearances